Alphonse Marie Tientcheu (born 4 September 1989) is a Cameroonian footballer who plays as a left wing-back for Equatorial Guinean Liga Nacional club Futuro Kings FC. He has been a member of the Cameroon national team.

References

1989 births
Living people
Cameroonian footballers
Association football fullbacks
Les Astres players
UMS de Loum players
Eding Sport FC players
Coton Sport FC de Garoua players
Futuro Kings FC players
Cameroonian expatriate footballers
Cameroonian expatriate sportspeople in Equatorial Guinea
Expatriate footballers in Equatorial Guinea
Cameroon A' international footballers
2018 African Nations Championship players